Slieve League or Slieve Liag is a mountain on the Atlantic coast of County Donegal, Ireland. At , it has the second-highest sea cliffs in Ireland after Croaghaun, and some of the highest sea cliffs in Europe.

The Belfast naturalist Robert Lloyd Praeger wrote in 1939:A tall mountain of nearly 2000 feet, precipitous on its northern side, has been devoured by the sea till the southern face forms a precipice likewise, descending on this side right into the Atlantic from the long knife-edge which forms the summit. The traverse of this ridge, the "One Man's Path", is one of the most remarkable walks to be found in Ireland - not actually dangerous, but needing a good head and careful progress on a stormy day....The northern precipice, which drops 1500 feet into the coomb surrounding the Little Lough Agh, harbours the majority of the alpine plants of Slieve League, the most varied group of alpines to be found anywhere in Donegal.

Slieve League is often photographed from a viewpoint known as Bunglass. It can be reached by means of a narrow road that departs from Teelin. The final few kilometers of this route is built along a precipice and includes several places where it turns at the crest of a rise.

Image gallery

References 

Mountains and hills of County Donegal
Cliffs of Ireland
Protected areas of County Donegal
Gaeltacht places in County Donegal
Marilyns of Ireland